This is a list of notable events in country music that took place in the year 1939.

Events

No dates
 sales recovered to approximately 2/3 of 1929 levels
 Billboard magazine begins publishing its first country music chart. Known as "Hillbilly Hits," the chart appears on a semi-regular (usually, monthly) basis, and will be published until early 1942. It is the predecessor for Billboard'''s later "Most Played Juke Box Folk Records," which would be published weekly and eventually evolve into today's Hot Country Songs chart.

Top Hillbilly (Country) Recordings

The following songs achieved the highest positions in Billboard magazine's 'Hillbilly Hits' chart, supplemented by 'Joel Whitburn's Pop Memories 1890-1954' and record sales reported on the "Discography of American Historical Recordings" website, and other sources as specified, during 1939. Numerical rankings are approximate, they are only used as a frame of reference.

 Births 
 January 12 – William Lee Golden, baritone (and long-bearded) member of the Oak Ridge Boys.
 January 19 – Phil Everly, of the Everly Brothers (died 2014).
 January 24 – Ray Stevens, country-pop singer releasing a long string of novelty-themed songs.
 February 14 – Razzy Bailey, blues-styled country vocalist of the 1980s.
 March 19 – Bob Kingsley, radio personality and longtime host of American Country Countdown and Bob Kingsley's Country Top 40'' (died 2019).
 April 20 – Johnny Tillotson, 1960s country singer ("It Keeps Right On A-Hurtin'").
 May 27 – Don Williams, baritone-voiced "Gentle Giant", one of country's biggest stars of the 1970s and 1980s (died 2017).
 June 11 – Wilma Burgess, 1960s country singer (died 2003).
 June 13 – Billy "Crash" Craddock, "Mr. Country Rock," gaining fame in the 1970s.
 August 8 – Phil Balsley, baritone-voiced member of the Statler Brothers.
 August 21 – Harold Reid, bass singer, member of the Statler Brothers (died 2020).
 September 6 – David Allen Coe, singer-songwriter and key member of the outlaw country movement of the 1970s.
 October 27 – Dallas Frazier, songwriter best known for "Elvira".
 October 27 – Ruby Wright, daughter of Johnnie Wright and Kitty Wells and member of their touring show (died 2009).
 December 29 – Ed Bruce, singer-songwriter, best known for writing "Mamas Don't Let Your Babies Grow Up to Be Cowboys." (died 2021)

See also
Western music (North America)

Further reading 
 Kingsbury, Paul, "Vinyl Hayride: Country Music Album Covers 1947–1989," Country Music Foundation, 2003
 Millard, Bob, "Country Music: 70 Years of America's Favorite Music," HarperCollins, New York, 1993
 Whitburn, Joel. "Top Country Songs 1944–2005 – 6th Edition." 2005.

References

Country
Country music by year